"Hooray for Captain Spaulding" is a song, composed by Bert Kalmar and Harry Ruby originally from the 1928 Marx Brothers Broadway musical Animal Crackers and the 1930 film version. It later became well known as the theme song for the Groucho Marx television show You Bet Your Life (1950–1961), and became Groucho's signature tune and was usually played when he was introduced on various talk shows and the like.

The modern version of the situation comedy radio show Flywheel, Shyster, and Flywheel uses this song for its opening theme.

The line, "I think I'll try to make her" was cut from the movie, being considered too risqué.

In 1951, Groucho recorded the song for release by Decca Records.

Chorus 
The song is a series of rhyming gags but ends with a loud repeated chorus that drown out the captain's attempts to speak.

Hooray for Captain Spaulding,

The African explorer.

He brought his name undying fame

And that is why we say,

Hooray, Hooray, Hooray.

References

External links
Transcript of scene

1928 songs
American songs
Groucho Marx songs
Marx Brothers
Songs about explorers
Songs about fictional male characters
Songs with lyrics by Bert Kalmar
Songs with music by Harry Ruby